Jatupat Boonpattararaksa, commonly known as Pai Dao Din (—a combination of his nickname Pai and the student activist group Dao Din) is a human rights defender and activist from Thailand, who was arrested on 3 December 2016 on charges of Lèse-majesté in Thailand, the first such case under King Vajiralongkorn, following which he faced a secret trial and was then imprisoned. He has been charged and imprisoned multiple times, including for sedition, and most recently, on March 9, 2021, was charged and imprisoned for lese majesty a second time. Jatupat is presently affiliated with the Free People movement.

Background 
Jatupat is from Chaiyaphum, in Northeast Thailand. His father, Viboon Boonpattararaksa, is a community lawyer who has sought to represent villagers assassinated on social justice cases, such as protecting the environment. Prior to his arrest, Jatupat was a law student in Khon Kaen, at the Faculty of Law at Khon Kaen University. Jatupat teaches traditional Northeast Thai musical instruments to school students.

Activism 
Jatupat was politically active as part of the Dao Din Group and a founding member in 2015 of the New Democracy Movement. At university, in 2013-2014, Jatupat participated in anti-mining protests in Loei, during which he came to the public's attention when a photograph of him pleading with the authorities not to disperse a protest went viral. Subsequently, the Dao Din group was granted an award by Thailand's National Human Rights Commission, which Jatupat accepted on behalf of the group.

Following the 2014 coup, while the military junta (the National Council for Peace and Order; NCPO) was successfully repressing pro-democracy activists with diktats restricting freedom of expression, Pai and other Dao Din members peacefully protested Prime Minister General Prayut Chan-o-cha at a function in Khon Kaen by flashing the three-finger Hunger Games salute in front of him.

Jatupat was arrested alongside other members of the Dao Din Group in 22 May 2015 and detained; he was later released pending an investigation. On 6 August 2016, he was arrested for distributing flyers protesting the new draft charter, which was being put to a referendum, under Article 61(2) of the Referendum Act, which effectively penalised campaigning against the Charter. He went on hunger strike and was released on bail.

On 22 May 2017, for violating the NCPO Head’s Order No. 3/2015 for participating in a gathering of over five people on 22 May 2015 to commemorate the May 2014 coup d’état, Jatupat was taken to the Military Court of Khon Kaen Province for trial together with seven other democracy activists.

In June 2017, Jatupat finished his bachelor's degree while being in jail.

Arrest and imprisonment for lèse-majesté 
Jatupat was accused of lèse majesté and was arrested on 3 December 2016 for "sharing" on his Facebook page a BBC Thai biography of King Vajiralongkorn as well as distributing material against Thailand's draft constitution. He was the first person to be arrested for lèse majesté during the new King's reign. While over 2,800 people shared the article on Facebook and it was read by millions, he was the only person to be arrested for lèse majesté.

After being bailed, Jatupat immediately posted a satirical Facebook message criticising the authorities. In a landmark bail hearing ruling, the court ruled that "the accused displayed behaviour via social media in a manner which ridiculed the authority of the state without fear of the nation’s laws, causing damage to the nation. The accused also had a tendency of acting in this way repeatedly." His bail was revoked on 22 December.

Jatupat initially pleaded innocent as he wanted to utilize his case to demonstrate to the public the injustices of the judicial process. However, after the court decided on a secret trial, in August 2017, he pleaded guilty and was sentenced to two and a half years in prison, on 16 August. Of the 2,600 persons who shared the biography online, Jatupat was the only one prosecuted. Several human rights groups have voiced outrage at the persecution of Jatupat and have initiated movements calling for justice. While in prison, Jatupat wrote poetry.

On 21 December 2017, while facing another charge related to holding an activity “Speaking for Freedom”, he testified at the military court at the Sripatcharin Camp of 23rd Royal Army Base while wearing his university graduation gown over his prison uniform.

On 7 January 2018, local villagers in Wang Saphung District, Loei Province, while issuing a statement regarding their struggle to protect the community and environment from gold mining, wore Jatupat masks in a show of solidarity.

He was released on May 10, 2019, shortly before the end of his term as the result of a royal pardon.

Role in Parliament 
After being released from jail, Jatupat became an official aide to MP Rangsiman Rome and had a role in Thailand's Parliament as Secretary of the Parliamentary Commission on Law, Justice, and Human Rights, and member of the Select Committee to Study and Solve the Problem of Infringement of Human Rights and Covert Harms to Citizens in affiliation with the Future Forward group. In this last role, he was able to face and  publicly question his accusers as to why he was had been charged.

Renewed activism 
On August 28, as part of the 2020 Thai protests, Jatupat turned himself in following a protest that resulted in a police summons; he has been charged with sedition. On 17 September, police searched a house where Jatupat and fellow activists were staying and seized 17 banners intended to be used for the 19 September protest. Although police refused to let the activist group photograph the search warrant, Jatupat live-streamed the event.

Jatupat was again arrested on 13 October 2020. He was detained for questioning for up to 12 days and is facing 12 charges, while 19 fellow activists are facing 10 charges. On 19 October, Dusit Kwaeng Court granted Jatupat bail, together with 18 other protesters.

Detained without Bail for Lese Majesty, Second Incident 
On March 8, 2021, Jatupat was again charged with lese majesty and imprisoned awaiting trial, along with protest leaders Panusaya Sithijirawattanakul (aka Rung) and Panupong Jadnok (aka Mike), for speeches they made on September 19, 2020, demanding reform of the monarchy. The three are in prison (as of April 1, 2021) and are not permitted to apply for bail.

Awards 
In 2017 Jatupat, while detained in a military court, was awarded the prestigious Gwangju Prize for Human Rights in recognition of his struggle against military dictatorship.

Music Videos 
Jatupat sings and performs in the song and YouTube music video "คนที่คุณก็รู้ว่าใคร" ("You Know Who") with the band สามัญชน Commoner, released February 3, 2021, which draws attention to 9 assassinated Thai political dissidents. He is also featured in two other big Thai protest music videos: in the song and YouTube music video "กล้ามาก เก่งมาก ขอบใจ" ("So Daring! So Talented! Thank You") (song by Paeng Surachet), with versions released December 5, 2020, and March 12, 2021, after Jatupat was already in jail: and in the song/music video "ไม่มีคนบนฟ้า" ("There is No One in the Sky") by t_047, released July 28 2021.

Analysis 
In 2017 Bangkok Post commentator Achara Ashayagachat described Jatupat as a role model for youth.

See also
 Lèse majesté in Thailand

References 

Boonpattararaksa Jatupat
Boonpattararaksa Jatupat
Amnesty International prisoners of conscience held by Thailand
People accused of lèse majesté in Thailand since 2020
People from Chaiyaphum province
Thai human rights activists
Thai monarchy reform activists
Thai political prisoners
People convicted of speech crimes
People convicted of political crimes
Recipients of Thai royal pardons
Thai revolutionaries